Beaverton may refer to:

Places

Canada
 Beaverton, Newfoundland and Labrador
 Beaverton, Ontario
 Beaverton Aerodrome

United States
 Beaverton, Alabama
 Beaverton Crossroads, Illinois
 Beaverton, Kansas
 Beaverton, Michigan
 Beaverton Township, Michigan
 Beaverton, Montana
 Beaverton, Oregon

Arts, entertainment and media
 Beaverton, a fictional town in South Park, in the episode "Two Days Before the Day After Tomorrow"
 The Beaverton, an online news satire publication in Canada
 The Beaverton (TV series), based on the publication

See also
 
 Beaver (disambiguation)
 Beavertown (disambiguation)
 Beaverville (disambiguation)
 Beaver City (disambiguation)